Prince Anusorn Mongkolkarn (April 1, 1915 – January 2, 1998) was a Thai film director and 1996 National Artist of Thailand recipient. He was a grandson of King Chulalongkorn, and also one of the indirect first-degree cousins to Kings Ananda Mahidol and Bhumibol Adulyadej as well as Princesses Galyani Vadhana and Bejaratana, since his father, Prince Yugala Dighambara was one of the paternal half-brothers of King Vajiravudh, King Prajadhipok and Prince Mahidol Adulyadej.

Personal life
He is son of Yugala Dighambara and Chalermkhetra Mangkala. Born on April 1, 1915, he has 2 older brothers namely,
 Bhanubandhu Yugala
 Chaloermphon Dighambara

Careers
He was film director in 1940–1998, his first film direction as Nam Yok Aao Nam Bong. (หนามยอกเอาหนามบ่ง) and last film direction as Kruea Fa. (เครือฟ้า). His famous film direction by him include Nang Tat. (นางทาส), Nguen Nguen Nguen. (เงิน เงิน เงิน) etc.

Death
He died on January 2, 1998.

Ancestry

References

External links
 http://www.soravij.com/yugala.html 
 ประวัติ จาก หออัครศิลปิน

Mongkolkarn, Anusorn
Mongkolkarn, Anusorn
Thai male Phra Ong Chao
Yukol family
Thai film directors
Thai writers
20th-century Chakri dynasty
National Artists of Thailand